Ozius truncatus, or the black finger crab or reef crab, is a crab of the family Menippidae, endemic to south eastern Australia and the North Island of New Zealand.

Reef crabs are very common occurring in intertidal and very shallow sub tidal areas. They are usually found under loose rocks on rocky shores.
Reef crabs are found in southern WA and on the southern Australian coast, and north to southern Queensland. They grow to 20 cm in diameter and they are common in shallow, temperate waters.

References
 Miller M & Batt G, Reef and Beach Life of New Zealand, William Collins (New Zealand) Ltd, Auckland, New Zealand 1973
 FaunaNet

Eriphioidea
Marine crustaceans of New Zealand
Crustaceans of Australia
Crustaceans described in 1834
Taxa named by Henri Milne-Edwards